The Veiled Society is an adventure module for the Basic Rules of the Dungeons & Dragons fantasy role-playing game published in 1984. The adventure's product designation is TSR 9086.

Plot summary
The Veiled Society is set in the city of Specularum, where the players must determine which of three rival factions is responsible for a murder.  In the violent city of Specularum, the Veiled Society has spies everywhere. Specularum is the capital of the Grand Duchy of Karameikos, and the adventure involves the party in a struggle between the city's three major families (the Vorloi, Radu, and Torenescu).

Publication history
The sixteen-page booklet with an outer folder was published by TSR in 1984 and designed by David "Zeb" Cook. It features cover artwork by Steve Chappell with interior illustrations by Jim Roslof. The module includes cardstock miniatures and sixteen pages of fold-together pieces which form nine cutout houses and a cutout gate.

The module was featured in the compilation B1-B9 In Search of Adventure in 1987.

Reception
Graham Staplehurst reviewed this module for White Dwarf issue No. 63, giving it 9 out of 10 overall, and felt it had "all the hallmarks of a classic adventure" despite what he felt were the "useless" cutouts. Staplehurst felt that having the adventure set in Specularum "provides players with almost unparalleled opportunity for personal choice and freedom for action", calling the adventure "true rolegaming and high drama", adding that the characters "must make the decisions of a real-life adventurer—and suffer the consequences!" He observed that the adventure's possibilities are structured to be used by less experienced Dungeon Masters (DMs), but each situation is detailed enough to allow for a variety of outcomes. Staplehurst felt that the plot read too much like a crude detective story, and gave the players little motivation. This, he felt, leaves extra preparatory work for the DM, who may want to weave the city into their campaign and make use of existing character histories, for the scenario to work to its full potential.

In his review of B1-9 In Search of Adventure in Dragon magazine No. 128 (December 1987), Ken Rolston calls David "Zeb" Cook's The Veiled Society one of the "two exceptionally fine adventures" in the compilation, and "a rare example of a political and diplomatic adventure in an urban setting for low-level D&D game characters".

In his 1991 book Heroic Worlds, Lawrence Schick calls this adventure "more thought-provoking than your usual hack-and-slash Basic scenario".

See also
 List of Dungeons & Dragons modules

References and footnotes

External links
http://www.rpg.net/news+reviews/reviews/rev_4119.html

Dungeons & Dragons modules
Mystara
Role-playing game supplements introduced in 1984